Shlomo Aronson may refer to:
 (1864–1935), first Ashkhenazi rabbi of Tel Aviv, grandfather of the historian
 Shlomo Aronson (landscape architect) (1936–2018), Israeli landscape architect
 Shlomo Aronson (historian) (1936–2020), Israeli historian